Cathy Caruth (born 1955) succeeded Jonathan Culler as Class of 1916 Professor of English at Cornell University, where she holds appointments in the departments of Literatures in English and Comparative Literature. After graduating cum laude from Princeton University, she received her Ph.D. in Comparative Literature from Yale. Before coming to Cornell, she taught at Yale, then Emory, where she developed an archive of Holocaust testimony, co-organized a national interdisciplinary conference on trauma, and significantly expanded the graduate program in Comparative Literature.

Robert Jay Lifton, M.D. has described Caruth as “one of the most innovative scholars on what we call trauma, and on our ways of perceiving and conceptualizing that still mysterious phenomenon.”  According to Jonathan Culler, she was "the first to realize the importance of trauma theory for the humanities. Working closely with psychoanalysts and psychologists to bring techniques of literary interpretation to bear on questions about the meaning of survival, and the nature of witnessing, she edited two historically important issues of American Imago on Psychoanalysis, Culture and Trauma.

Works

Authored

Edited
 
 co-edited with Deborah Esch,

References

External links

Emory University faculty
1955 births
Living people
American academics of English literature
Yale Graduate School of Arts and Sciences alumni
Cornell University faculty
20th-century American women writers
20th-century American non-fiction writers
21st-century American women writers
American women non-fiction writers
21st-century American non-fiction writers
American women academics